Thomas the Tank Engine & Friends is a children's television series about the engines and other characters working on the railways of the Island of Sodor, and is based on The Railway Series books written by the Reverend W. Awdry. It was produced by Clearwater Features Ltd. for Britt Allcroft (Thomas) Ltd. and Central Independent Television. 

This article lists and details episodes from the second series of the show, which was first broadcast in 1986. This series was initially narrated by Ringo Starr for the United Kingdom audiences, who later re-narrated 16 episodes for the United States. The entire series was narrated by George Carlin for US audiences.

Production

Stories
Christopher Awdry was commissioned to write a new Railway Series book as source material for the second series. Three stories from More About Thomas the Tank Engine provided additional roles for Bertie the Bus, Terence the Tractor, and Harold the Helicopter. The episodes "Thomas and the Missing Christmas Tree" and "Thomas and Trevor" were both one-off stories written by Christopher. The following series would begin to use original stories by the production staff, with some of the remaining Railway Series stories deemed "repetitive and too 'storybook' orientated".

Filming
Early in production, a third episode based on The Twin Engines was due to be filmed, based largely on the story "The Missing Coach". This was originally to be the episode Donald and Douglas the Scottish twins were introduced in. It was thought that the model crew had gone as far as filming scenes on the Tidmouth Station set with Thomas arriving at the station, before Britt Allcroft decided the episode had too little action and its storyline would be too difficult to understand by younger viewers. Subsequently, the episode was cancelled and the story's exposition was instead included in the episode adaptation of the story “Break Van”, which would instead serve as the twin engines’ introductory episode. 

In August 2020, there was a leak on Twitter that showed that the crew had filmed virtually the whole episode, including and up to the scene where Donald and Douglas swap tenders to impersonate each other (the scene that made Allcroft deem the story too confusing to air on TV), and the audio is the only thing missing. Several promotional stills from the filming of "The Missing Coach" have surfaced in various Thomas publications over the years, while the series’ original director David Mitton was believed to be in possession of the original film footage.

This season began production in September 1985 and completed filming in June 1986.

Episodes

Characters

Introduced

 Duck ("Duck Takes Charge")
 Donald and Douglas ("Break Van")
 Bill and Ben ("The Diseasel")
 Diesel ("Pop Goes the Diesel")
 Daisy ("Daisy")
 BoCo ("The Diseasel")
 The Spiteful Brake Van ("Break Van")
 Trevor ("Saved from Scrap")
 Harold ("Percy & Harold")
 Jem Cole ("Saved from Scrap")
 The Vicar of Wellsworth ("Saved from Scrap")

Recurring cast

Thomas
Edward
Henry
Gordon
James
Percy
Toby
Annie and Clarabel
Henrietta
Troublesome Trucks
Terence
Bertie
The Fat Controller
Mrs. Kyndley
Stephen Hatt (cameo)
Bridget Hatt (cameo)

References

Festival Records video albums
Mushroom Records video albums
Warner Records video albums
1986 British television seasons
Thomas & Friends seasons